Jean-Michel Defaye (born 18 September 1932) is a French pianist, composer, arranger and conductor known for his collaboration with French poet and singer-songwriter Léo Ferré.

He was born in Saint-Mandé, Val-de-Marne near Paris, on 18 September 1932. Aged ten he entered the Paris Conservatoire and completed his musical training in theory, piano and composition, taking in Nadia Boulanger's accompaniment class. In 1952 he won the Premier Second Grand Prix de Rome and the following year he won second prize in composition for the Belgian Queen Elisabeth competition.

As a composer he wrote mostly for brass and especially trombone.

As an arranger, he worked during ten years with Léo Ferré. He is mostly known by general public in France today for this body of work. At piano in the Olympia Big Band.

Classical works 
 Suite Marine
 Morceau de Concours I (SG 1–2)
 Morceau de Concours II (SG 3–4)
 Morceau de Concours III (SG 5)
 Deux Danses, for trombone and piano (1954)
 Quatre pièces, for trombones quartet (1954)
 Sonatine (1956)
 Mouvement, for trombone and piano (1972)
 Fluctuations, for solo trombone, 6 trombones and 2 percussions (1987)
 À la manière de Bach, for trombone and piano (1990)
 Suite entomologique, for trombone and piano (1992)
 Œuvre de concours I, for trombone and piano (1993)
 Œuvre de concours II, for trombone and piano (1993)
 Œuvre de concours III, for trombone and piano (1993)
 À la manière de Schumann, for trombone and piano (2000)
 À la manière de Debussy, for trombone and piano (2001)
 À la manière de Vivaldi, for trombone and piano (2002)
 À la manière de Stravinsky, for trombone and piano (2005)
 À la manière de Brahms, for trombone and piano (2011)
 Musique à Curitiba, for trombone solo and 16 trombones (????)

Discography

with Léo Ferré
 1957: Les Fleurs du mal
 1960: Paname
 1961: Les Chansons d'Aragon
 1961: Récital à l'Alhambra (live)
 1962: La Langue française
 1964: Ferré 64
 1964: Verlaine et Rimbaud
 1965: Ni Dieu ni maître (EP)
 1966: Léo Ferré 1916-19...
 1967: Cette chanson (La Marseillaise)
 1967: Léo Ferré chante Baudelaire
 1969: L'Été 68
 1969: Les Douze Premières Chansons de Léo Ferré
 1970: Amour Anarchie
 1972: La Solitudine
 2003: Les Chansons interdites... et autres (recorded in 1961)

References 

1932 births
Living people
People from Saint-Mandé
Conservatoire de Paris alumni
20th-century French composers
French music arrangers
French film score composers
Prix de Rome for composition
French male film score composers
20th-century French male musicians